WRA can refer to:

Organisations 
 War Relocation Authority, a WWII US internment agency
 Water Resources Agency, Taiwan
 White Ribbon Association (formerly British Women's Temperance Association)
 World Road Association, an international forum
 Wildrose Alliance, a political party in Alberta, Canada

Places in the United States 
 Western Reserve Academy, a private school in Ohio
 Worcester Regional Airport, Massachusetts